Cochlicellidae is a family of small air-breathing land snails, terrestrial pulmonate gastropod mollusks in the superfamily Helicoidea (according to the taxonomy of the Gastropoda by Bouchet & Rocroi, 2005).

The family Cochlicellidae has no subfamilies (according to the taxonomy of the Gastropoda by Bouchet & Rocroi, 2005).

Genera 
The type genus is Cochlicella Férussac, 1821

Genera in the family Cochlicellidae include:
 Cochlicella Férussac, 1821
 subgenus Prietocella Schileyko & Menkhorst, 1997
 Monilearia Mousson, 1872

References

External links